The Denmark men's national tennis team represents Denmark in Davis Cup tennis competition and are governed by the Danish Tennis Association.

Denmark currently compete in the Europe/Africa Zone of Group II.  They competed in the World Group from 1988 to 1989 and again from 1993 to 1996. Since that time the team has failed to return to the World Group.

Current team (2022) 

 August Holmgren
 Johannes Ingildsen
 Christian Sigsgaard
 Elmer Møller
 Frederik Nielsen

History
Denmark competed in its first Davis Cup in 1921.

All players

See also
Davis Cup
Denmark Fed Cup team

References

External links

Davis Cup teams
Davis Cup
Davis Cup